Monosodium methyl arsenate (MSMA) is an arsenic-based herbicide. It is an organo-arsenate; less toxic than the inorganic form of arsenates. However, the EPA states that all forms of arsenic are a serious risk to human health and the United States' Agency for Toxic Substances and Disease Registry ranked arsenic as number 1 in its 2001 Priority List of Hazardous Substances at Superfund sites. 

Arsenic is classified as a Group-A carcinogen. The EPA states that:

Trade names include:

Target 6 Plus
Target 6.6
MSMA 6 Plus
MSMA 6.6

References

Specific

Organoarsenic compounds
Sodium compounds
Arsenical herbicides
Fungicides